The 2014-2015 cyclo-cross season consists of three international series conducted in the bicycle racing discipline of cyclo-cross:
World Cup
Superprestige
BPost Bank Trophy

The season began on 5 October with the Superprestige Gieten, won by Mathieu van der Poel. It ended on 14 February 2015.

Race calendar

National Championships

See also
2015 UCI Cyclo-cross World Championships
2013–14 cyclo-cross season
2014–15 in women's Cyclo-cross season

References

2014 in cyclo-cross
2015 in cyclo-cross
Cyclo-cross by year